The 2018 UCI Women's World Tour was a competition that included twenty-four road cycling events throughout the 2018 women's cycling season. It was the third edition of the ranking system launched by the Union Cycliste Internationale (UCI) in 2016. The competition began with Strade Bianche on 3 March and concluded with the Tour of Guangxi on 21 October. Anna van der Breggen of the Netherlands was the defending champion.

Van der Breggen, riding for the  team, was unable to defend her title, as she finished third in the standings behind compatriots Annemiek van Vleuten and Marianne Vos, who was riding for the  squad. Having taken three podium finishes, van Vleuten took the top spot after a strong second half of the season commencing at the women's Grand Tour, the Giro Rosa. Van Vleuten won three of the last four stages, taking the overall victory by over four minutes from her closest competitor, as well as winning the race's points classification. Two days later, at La Course by Le Tour de France, van Vleuten took victory on the finish line, surpassing van der Breggen, who had faded over the closing stages. Van Vleuten then took the World Tour jersey for the season, winning the overall at the Holland Ladies Tour, again with three stage victories, ultimately finishing on 1411.86 points.

Vos finished 16.98 points behind in second place, with a tally of 1394.88 points. After podium finishes at the Trofeo Alfredo Binda, and the Women's Tour, Vos took her first victory of the season with a stage win at the Giro Rosa, before a second-place finish in RideLondon's Classique race. In the August Scandinavian races, Vos won the Postnord UCI WWT Vårgårda  road race, before taking a clean sweep of the Ladies Tour of Norway, winning all three stages and the general classification, taking the World Tour lead in the process. Vos ended her road season after another second-place finish at the GP de Plouay – Lorient Agglomération, shifting her focus to the cyclo-cross season starting in the following month, losing the lead to van Vleuten in the process. Van der Breggen, with 1323.33 points, led the classification for most of the season, taking four victories by the end of the April, including the season-opening Strade Bianche, and two of the three Ardennes classics, with only the Amstel Gold Race – won by teammate Chantal Blaak – not going to van der Breggen. Van der Breggen skipped the Giro Rosa, and failed to win another individual race on the World Tour, with her only remaining success of the season coming during the Postnord UCI WWT Vårgårda  team time trial.

In the World Tour's other classifications,  rider Sofia Bertizzolo from Italy was the winner of the youth classification for riders under the age of 23.

Teams

Events
For the 2018 season, the calendar consisted of 24 races, up from 20 in 2017. All 2017 races returned for the 2018 calendar, with the additions of the Three Days of Bruges–De Panne, the Emakumeen Euskal Bira and the Tour of Guangxi to the calendar. The Ladies Tour of Norway also added a stand-alone team time trial that awarded full points to the rankings, held the day before the main stage race.

Points standings
For the 2018 season, a new point-scoring system was introduced by the Union Cycliste Internationale (UCI), rewarding the top 40 riders rather than the top 20 as in 2017. Further changes were made to the teams classification, where all point-scoring riders were counted in the rankings.

Individual
Riders tied with the same number of points were classified by number of victories, then number of second places, third places, and so on, in World Tour events and stages.

Youth

The top three riders in the final results of each World Tour event's young rider classification received points towards the standings. Six points were awarded to first place, four points to second place and two points to third place.

Team
Team rankings were calculated by adding the ranking points of all the riders of a team in the table.

Notes

References

External links

 
2018 in women's road cycling
UCI Women's World Tour